Hromov is a surname. Notable people with the surname include:

Artem Hromov (born 1990), Ukrainian footballer
Viktor Hromov (born 1965), Ukrainian footballer

Ukrainian-language surnames